Japan Relief is an archival live album release by the American rock band Phish. The show was recorded on July 31, 1999 during one of Phish's performances at that year's Fuji Rock Festival at the Naeba Ski Resort in Niigata Prefecture, Japan. All proceeds from this show were sent to the Peace Winds America and their Japanese relief program, Peace Winds Japan, following the 2011 Tōhoku earthquake and tsunami. The show was later made available through Phish's LivePhish website in limited CD format as well as through MP3 and lossless download format.

The Fuji Rock Festival marked the first time Phish would play in Japan. Phish archivist said about the show "The July 31st show crackled with energy, intermingling classic and new material with an exploratory vibe that meshed with the atmosphere of respect and beauty." The show features tibetan musician, Nawang Khechog, who spoke about Tibetan human rights before performing on Universal Horn/Vacuum Jam and Brian And Robert playing tibetan horn and wood flute.

Track listing

Set One 
 My Friend, My Friend (Anastasio/Marshall)
 Golgi Apparatus (Anastasio/Marshall/Szuter/Woolf)
 Back On The Train (Anastasio/Marshall)
 Limb By Limb (Anastasio/Marshall/Herman)
 Free (Anastasio/Marshall)
 Roggae (Anastasio/Fishman/Gordon/McConnell/Marshall)
 Sparkle (Anastasio/Marshall)
 Character Zero (Anastasio/Marshall)

Set Two 
 2001 (Deodato)
 David Bowie (Anastasio)
 Wading In The Velvet Sea (Anastasio/Marshall)
 Prince Caspian (Anastasio/Marshall)
 Fluffhead (Anastasio/Pollak)
 The Squirming Coil (Anastasio/Marshall)

Encore 
 Nawang Khechog Speech
 Universal Horn/Vacuum Jam (Khechog/Fishman)
 Brian And Robert (Anastasio/Marshall)
 Simple (Gordon)

Filler 
 What's The Use? - from 7/29/99 Soundcheck (Anastasio/Fishman/Gordon/McConnell)

Personnel
Trey Anastasio – guitars, lead vocals, co-lead vocals on "Roggae"
Page McConnell – piano, organ, backing vocals, co-lead vocals on "Roggae"
Mike Gordon – bass, backing vocals, co-lead vocals on "Roggae"
Jon Fishman – drums, backing vocals, co-lead vocals on "Roggae", vacuum on "Universal Horn/Vacuum Jam"
Nawang Khechog – speech on "Nawang Khechog Speech", Tibetan horn on "Universal Horn/Vacuum Jam", wood flute on "Brian and Robert"

Reference List

External links 
 Phish.com - Official Site
 LivePhish.com - Japan Relief 
 Phish.net - July 31, 1999

LivePhish.com Downloads
Phish live albums